The International Structural Engineering and Construction Society (ISEC) is a non-profit professional body founded in 2001 to represent members of the civil engineering, structural engineering, and construction engineering profession worldwide. Based in Fargo, North Dakota, it offers educational conferences, seminars, and literature through an international network of advisors and regional representatives.

Mission
According to its website, "The mission of ISEC Conferences is to enhance communication and understanding between structural, system, and construction engineers, for successful design and construction of engineering projects. Interdisciplinary integration and international cooperation are encouraged. ISEC conferences promote innovative and integrative approaches in life cycle systems thinking in civil and building engineering that include constructability, specifications, design, bidding, and construction. It is the purpose of ISEC to provide an international forum for the discussion of topics important to developing new knowledge in construction and structural engineering. The aim of ISEC is to conduct such conferences at an international level.".

Conferences and education
ISEC hosts biennial international conferences and regional conferences.  The international Conferences are held in all odd number years, while the regional conferences (ASEA SEC and EURO MED SEC) are held in even number years.

The upcoming conferences are scheduled to be held for ASEA-SEC-6 in Sydney, Australia in November/December 2022; in Chicago, USA for ISEC-12 in August 2023

ISEC Press
In 2014, ISEC Society launched ISEC Press as a publishing subsidiary.  The title is now known as "Proceedings of International Structural Engineering and Construction," carrying an ISSN number of 2644-108X.

The articles go through a rigorous peer-review process.  Abstracts are reviewed double-blind, whereas the manuscripts are reviewed single-blind.  All articles go through an extensive copyediting process.

Publications
To date, ISEC has published its proceedings from international and regional conferences, containing around 3,500 peer-reviewed papers from close to 60 countries.  These are accessible in the ISEC Proceedings Archive.

Sponsors, co-sponsors, promoters, and endorsers
ISEC Society conferences have been supported by a large number of professional organizations.

Registrations, indexing, archiving
All titles of the Proceedings of International Structural Engineering and Construction carry a DOI number, are registered with Crossref as journal articles, indexed in Scopus, and archived in ClockSS.

References

External links

American engineering organizations
Civil engineering professional associations
Engineering societies
Organizations based in Honolulu
Organizations established in 2001
Structural engineering